Mark Schneider may refer to:

Mark Schneider (politician), Democratic politician who served in the Ohio House of Representatives from 2009 to 2011
Mark Schneider (media executive), British media executive, co-founder of GB News 
Mark L. Schneider (born 1941), director of the Peace Corps, 1999–2001
Ulf Mark Schneider (born 1965), businessman

See also
Marc Schneider (disambiguation)